Saiva Siddhanta Temple is an organization that identifies itself with the Saivite Hindu religion. It supports the work of the late Satguru Sivaya Subramuniyaswami, a spiritual teacher initiated by Siva Yogaswami of Jaffna with the honorary title Gurudeva. The mission of the temple is to preserve and promote the Saivite Hindu religion. Membership in the temple extends to many countries in the world, including the US, Canada, Mauritius, Malaysia, Singapore, India, Sri Lanka and several European nations. Members are organized into regional missions with the goal of supporting Saivism in their families, communities, and in the global community under the leadership of Satguru Bodhinatha Veylanswami.

History
The Temple was founded in 1949 by Satguru Sivaya Subramuniyaswami, a Saiva Hindu Guru initiated by his guru, Siva Yogaswami of Jaffna. The name of the Temple is from the Tamil language and could be roughly rendered in English as "The Temple of God Śiva's Revealed Truth." The Saiva Siddhanta Temple was incorporated under the laws of the United States of America in the State of California on December 30, 1957, and received recognition of its US Internal Revenue tax exempt status as a temple on February 12, 1962. Among America's oldest Hindu institutions, it established its international headquarters at Kauai Aadheenam, also known as Kauai's Hindu Monastery, on Kauai, Hawaii, on February 5, 1970. Kauai's Hindu Monastery has two temples, Iraivan Temple and Kadavul Temple.

Purpose

The Saiva Siddhanta Temple supports all major projects supervised by Satguru Bodhinatha Veylanswami, including:
 Construction of the Iraivan Temple on Kauai, a white granite stone Siva temple sculpted in India.
 Publication of the magazine Hinduism Today. The magazine is widely read among Hindus in India and in the worldwide diaspora. Thus, it provides an important means for worldwide networking, which is widely acknowledged.
 Publication and distribution of books, booklets, and online material aimed at educating Hindus and non-Hindus about the Saivite Hindu religion.
 Teaching through lessons, literature, study courses, travel-study programs and youth retreats those actively pursuing the spiritual path under his guidance.
 Establishment and administration of charity organizations for Hindus worldwide, under the umbrella of Hindu Heritage Endowment.

Theology
The Saiva Siddhanta Temple belongs to a monistic branch of the school of Saiva Siddhanta. Its theology is grounded in the Vedas, Saiva Agamas and the ancient Tirumantiram, a Tamil scripture composed by Tirumular. The temple's theology is based on a synthesis of devotional theism and uncompromising nondualism. It is referred to as "monistic theism", which recognizes that monism and dualism/pluralism are equally valid perspectives. God is both within us and outside of us, the Creator and the creation, immanent and transcendent. Satguru Sivaya Subramuniyaswami explains:

Kauai Hindu Monastery
Kauai Hindu Monastery is situated on the Kauai island in Hawaii, consisting of two temples: Kadavul Temple and Iraivan Temple.  Kadavul was established in 1973 by Sivaya Subramuniyaswami. Construction of Iraivan began in 1990; it is the first all-stone, white granite temple to be built in the western hemisphere.

In the press
Referring to the Iraivan Temple, New York Times reporter Michelle Kayal wrote: 

Since 1973 the temple has maintained a second temple at the Kauai Aadheenam, called Kadavul Temple, which has Siva Nataraja as the enshrined deity.

Gallery

Notes

External links
 Śaiva Siddhanta Temple's homepage

Shaivism
Hinduism in the United States
Hinduism in Hawaii
Hindu denominations